Afropisidium pirothi is a species of bivalve belonging to the family Sphaeriidae.

The species is found in Africa.

References

Sphaeriidae
 Bivalves described in 1881
 Bivalves of Africa